Dagali is a small mountain village in Buskerud, Norway.

Summary
Dagali is located in Hol municipality. The village stretches from Pålsbufjorden on the east to the border of the Hardangervidda National Park in the west, a distance of approximately 40 km. The river Numedalslågen runs through the village. Dagali had an airport, Geilo Airport, Dagali, that is no longer in use. The site is currently used by Dagali Opplevelser, which offers outdoor recreational activities including water rafting and snowmobiling.

Dagali Church (Dagali kirke) dates from 1850. The church was constructed of wood and has the seating capacity of around 200 people. Dagali church was rebuilt and restored during 1972–73. Dagali Church is located off Norwegian National Road  Rv 40, about 25 kilometres from Geilo.

Climate

Dagali features a subarctic climate (Köppen Dfc) with cold, extremely snowy winters and somewhat cool summers, typical of higher altitudes (798m asl). Dagali airport weather station has some of the coldest temperatures in Southern Norway with a mean temperature in the coldest month (January) of -11,2 °C for the period 2001 to present. This is especially true considering how much the climate of Norway has warmed only in the last decades. Precipitation remains moderate at 515mm yearly (Fagerlund 871m asl - 1958-88) for one of the two weather stations there (one no longer in usage).

Weather charts

Averages from the no longer operational Dagali-Fagerlund and extremes. Back then, January averaged -8.9 and July averaged 10.8 making it still a subarctic (Dfc) climate.

References

External links
 Dagali Opplevelser - offering a great deal of activities in and around Dagali
 Rafting in Numedalslågen River
 Dagali Skisenter - The alpine resort in Dagali

Villages in Buskerud
Populated places on the Numedalslågen